Encantado is the eighth studio album by British ambient dance band System 7.

"Encantado" is a Spanish word that means "enchanted" or "entranced". Hillage and Giraudy were inspired to use this title following a visit to Coba on the Yucatán Peninsula.

Track listing

References

External links 

 Encantado • discography on the official System 7 website

2004 albums
System 7 (band) albums
Albums produced by Steve Hillage